On the Border is a 1930 all-talking drama with songs that stars Rin Tin Tin. It was adapted from a story by Lillie Hayward who also wrote the screenplay. Armida sings two songs in the picture.

Plot
Philo McCullough, as Farrell, is the head of a smuggling ring who are attempting to smuggle Chinese workers across the border from Mexico. McCullough stops at a hacienda, near the Mexican border, which is owned by Bruce Covington (as Don Jose). Covington's dog, Rin Tin Tin, senses that something is hidden under the vegetables, which McCullough has in his trucks, and discovers the Chinese. McCullough attempts to buy the hacienda from Covington. McCullough also hopes to get Armida (as Pepita), Covington's daughter, as part of the deal. Meanwhile, some border agents (John Litel and William Irving) disguised as tramps, discover McCullough's plans. Armida and Rin Tin Tin take a liking to Litel. Meanwhile, Covington has innocently sold his hacienda to McCullough. When the smugglers find out who Litel real is, they capture him. Rin Tin Tin manages to save him at the last minute. The Border Patrol then surrounds the hacienda and as Farrell tries to escape in a car but Rin Rin Tin captures him in the nick of time.

Cast
Rin Tin Tin as Rinty
Armida as Pepita
John Litel as Dave
Philo McCullough as Farrell 
Bruce Covington as Don José 
Walter Miller as Border Patrol Commander 
William Irving as Dusty

Preservation
A 16mm copy of the film is preserved at the Wisconsin Center for Film and Theater Research. The Library of Congress-Packard Campus for Audio-Visual Conservation  for Film and  also holds an incomplete print.

References

External links 
 1893-1993
 
 

1930 films
1930 drama films
Warner Bros. films
American drama films
American black-and-white films
Films directed by William C. McGann
Rin Tin Tin
Films about illegal immigration to the United States
1930s English-language films
1930s American films